MCI Management Center Innsbruck is a privately organized business school in Innsbruck, Austria offering study programs leading to Bachelor and Master degrees as well as Executive Master programs (MBA, MSc, LL.M.), Executive Certificate programs, Management seminars, Customized programs and research.

History and Organisation 

The Management Center Innsbruck (MCI) was founded in 1995-96 as a university center under private law and owned largely by public organizations. The funding structure is as follows:
 75% "Träger-Verein MZT" comprising the Tyrolean regional authority, the Innsbruck local authority, the Tyrolean Chamber of Commerce, the Tyrolean Chamber of Labor, the Federation of Tyrolean Industries, the University of Innsbruck, and the Faculty of Social Science and Economics at the University of Innsbruck
 12.5% "Träger-Verein Technik"
 12.5% "Träger-Verein Tourismus"

The work of the MCI is additionally supported by sponsoring companies from a variety of industries.

The MCI is accredited to provide university-level applied science study programs pursuant to Art. 2 of the Austrian University of Applied Sciences Studies Act.

Campus & Student Life 

MCI is located in the center of Innsbruck offering 5 different campuses:

 MCI I +II: centrally located between the historic Old Town of Innsbruck and sharing the ground with the Faculty of Theology and the Faculty of Economics & Statistics of Innsbruck University, Universitaetsstrasse 15
 MCI III: Weiherburggasse 15, hosting MCI programs in the field of tourism
 MCI IV: Maximilianstrasse 2, holding MCI programs in the field of engineering and technical sciences
 MCI V: Kapuzinergasse 9
Being part of the Open University Innsbruck concept, MCI and the Innsbruck University share infrastructure like lecture rooms, laboratories, sports facilities and cafeterias.
 These locations are to be replaced by a central campus adjoining Innsbruck's Hofgarten (opening 2020).

A co-operation agreement with the University of Innsbruck gives MCI students access to student services provided by Innsbruck University (e.g. libraries, sports facilities, etc).

Bachelor & Master programs 
The consecutive Bachelor and Master programs are university-level applied science study programs. Between the beginning of the 2005 winter semester and the 2009 winter semester, all MCI study programs were reorganized on the Bachelor/Master model as defined in the European Bologna Process. Students at the MCI can also take advantage of the option to spend a semester at one its 200 partner universities around the world. Double-degree and joint-degree programs are also offered currently with a total of eight partner universities.

Doctorate 
A cooperation agreement between the University of Innsbruck and the MCI provides for  cooperation with regard to doctoral programs. The MCI also provides tutoring for dissertations at currently ten other universities at home and abroad.

Executive Education

Executive Master programs 
MCI's postgraduate Executive Master programs are being offered within the framework of the Austrian University Law and are additionally accredited by the Foundation for International Business Administration Accreditation (FIBAA).
MCI's LL.M.-program "International Business & Tax Law" is offered as a dual-degree study program in co-operation with the Frankfurt School of Finance & Management (FSFM). It is evenly split between  Innsbruck and Frankfurt/Main and leads to the degrees of MCI and FSFM.

Executive Certificate Courses 
Credits obtained for an Executive Certificate program are recognized for the above postgraduate Master study programs. Students who complete specific combinations of several certificate programs and write a final thesis at an appropriate academic standard (Master thesis) can be admitted to the academic degree of an MBA, MSc or LL.M.

Partner universities 
The MCI collaborates with about 280 partner universities, where students can spend one or more semesters of their study program. Additionally, double degree agreements exist with some of the MCI's partner universities.

Awards & Rankings 
AACSB International
MCI is one of the  few universities in German-speaking countries accredited by AACSB – the Association to Advance Collegiate Schools of Business, established in 1916 in the United States.

Universum Talent Survey 2017
The international Universum Survey showed  that MCI won in the categories "Strongest Focus on Employability" and "Best Career Service" and ranked as 2nd Place in the category "Most Satisfied Students".

CHE Hochschulranking
The latest university ranking by the international center for higher education CHE listed programs in Economics, Social Sciences, Industrial Engineering and Management among the top 80 programs it tracks.

FIBAA's Premium Seal
The Foundation for International Business Administration Accreditation (FIBAA) has awarded its Premium Seal to the MCI's Executive Master study programs (Registered as a non-profit foundation under Swiss law and headquartered in Bonn, FIBAA operates as a European accreditation agency offering additional national accreditation)

 General Management Executive MBA, and
 Master of Science in Management MSc.

ECTS-Label
On June 11, 2009, the MCI became the first Austrian university to be awarded the DS label and the ECTS—Label by the European Commission in Brussels. The two labels were renewed by the Commission in 2013.

References 

Organisations based in Innsbruck
Buildings and structures in Tyrol (state)
Education in Tyrol (state)
Business schools in Austria